Inchamakinna (Gaeilge:Inse Mic Cionaith) is an island in County Galway, Ireland.

Demographics

References

Islands of County Galway
Uninhabited islands of Ireland